A communiqué is a brief report or statement released by a public agency.

Communiqué may also refer to:
 Communiqué (band), a rock band
 Communiqué (Dire Straits album) (and its respective title track), 1979
 Communiqué (Steve Lacy & Mal Waldron album), 1987
 "Communique", a song by John Frusciante and Josh Klinghoffer from their 2004 album A Sphere in the Heart of Silence
 Communiqué, the newsletter of the Association for Preservation Technology International
 Communiqué, the newsletter of the National Association of School Psychologists
 The Communiqué, the official newsletter for STARFLEET: The International Star Trek Fan Association, Inc.